Niwari district is one of the 52 districts of the Madhya Pradesh state in India. Niwari is administrative headquarter of Niwari district.

This district was formed on 1 October 2018. It was formerly part of Tikamgarh district. Niwari is the smallest district of Madhya Pradesh.

Niwari has 3 tehsils: Prithvipur, Niwari and Orchha.

Demographics 
At the time of the 2011 census, Niwari district had a population of 404,807, of which 79,218 (19.57%) lived in urban areas. Niwari had a sex ratio of 897 females per 1000 males. Scheduled Castes and Scheduled Tribes make up 99,441 (24.57%) and 18,244 (4.51%) of the population respectively.

Niwari district has 396,427 (97.93%) Hindus and 6,279 (1.55%) Muslims.

At the time of the 2011 census, 60.23% of the population spoke Bundeli and 39.51% Hindi as their first language.

References

External links 
 Official website

 
Districts of Madhya Pradesh